New York State Route 189 (NY 189) is a north–south state highway located near the northern border of New York in the United States. It extends for  through the Clinton County town of Clinton from a junction with U.S. Route 11 (US 11) to the Canada–US border, where it continues into Quebec as Route 209. In between, the two-lane NY 189 serves the small hamlet of Churubusco. Outside of Churubusco, the highway passes through rural, undeveloped areas. NY 189 was assigned to its current alignment as part of the 1930 renumbering of state highways in New York and has remained untouched since.

Route description

NY 189 starts at an intersection with US 11 in the town of Clinton. The route progresses northward as a two-lane highway, passing a lone farm just after US 11. Over the next , NY 189 passes through highly isolated areas of Clinton County dominated by patches of forests interspersed with small clearings. After Lagree Road and Swamp Road, two local roads maintained by the town of Clinton, the route passes by a small handful of residences on its way into the hamlet of Churubusco, the only community along NY 189. Here, it intersects with County Route 8 (CR 8), named Looby Road west of NY 189 and Clinton Mills Road east of the highway. The route continues north through the western portion of the small community, passing by the former site of NY 189's U.S. Customs and Border Protection station, once located in what is now a clearing south of Broad Street.

The route's second and last intersection in Churubusco is with Broad Street, which links NY 189 to the more populated eastern half of the hamlet. North of Churubusco, NY 189 passes through more forests and fields and serves only a small amount of isolated residences and farms. NY 189 continues north to the border, where it ends upon passing the Churubusco–Franklin Centre Border Crossing. Past the station, the highway continues north into the Canadian province of Quebec as Route 209.

History
What is now NY 189 was originally taken over by the state of New York in the late 1920s. Work to improve the highway to state highway standards began around this time and was completed . In the 1930 renumbering of state highways in New York, several of the routes assigned during the 1920s were renumbered or modified. At the same time, hundreds of state-maintained highways that did not yet have a route number were assigned one. One of these was the north–south highway connecting US 11 to the Canada–US border via Churubusco, which was designated as NY 189. The route has not been altered since that time.

Major intersections

See also

List of county routes in Jefferson County, New York

References

External links

189
Transportation in Clinton County, New York